

255001–255100 

|-id=019
| 255019 Fleurmaxwell ||  || Fleur Maxwell (born 1988), Luxembourg's 2005 national champion figure skater. || 
|-id=073
| 255073 Victoriabond ||  || Victoria Bond, popular Australian science radio presenter of "Diffusion Science Radio" || 
|}

255101–255200 

|-bgcolor=#f2f2f2
| colspan=4 align=center | 
|}

255201–255300 

|-id=257
| 255257 Mechwart ||  || András Mechwart (1834–1907), a Hungarian industrialist || 
|}

255301–255400 

|-id=308
| 255308 Christianzuber ||  ||  (1930–2005), a French journalist, writer, film producer and lecturer. || 
|}

255401–255500 

|-bgcolor=#f2f2f2
| colspan=4 align=center | 
|}

255501–255600 

|-id=587
| 255587 Gardenia ||  || Gardenia, a genus of flowering plants in the coffee family Rubiaceae. The genus was named after Alexander Garden, a Scottish-born American naturalist. || 
|-id=598
| 255598 Paullauterbur ||  || Paul Lauterbur (1929–2007), an American chemist and Nobel Laureate || 
|}

255601–255700 

|-bgcolor=#f2f2f2
| colspan=4 align=center | 
|}

255701–255800 

|-id=703
| 255703 Stetson ||  || Peter B. Stetson (born 1952), a Canadian astronomer and developer of freely-available software for the analysis of CCD images and spectra, who is a co-discoverer of minor planets || 
|}

255801–255900 

|-bgcolor=#f2f2f2
| colspan=4 align=center | 
|}

255901–256000 

|-id=989
| 255989 Dengyushian ||  || Teng Yu-hsien (1906–1944), a Taiwanese musician, known as the Father of Taiwanese Folk Music. He wrote many famous melodies which are considered to be the symbols of Taiwan's mind and spirit. || 
|}

References 

255001-256000